Julien Robert (born 11 December 1974 in Grenoble) is a retired French biathlete.

As a member of the French team, he won bronze at the 2002 Winter Olympics in Salt Lake City and at the 2006 Winter Olympics in Turin.

He also has two medals from World Championships: gold in Pokljuka in 2001, and bronze in Oberhof in 2004.

He was married to French Olympic Champion Florence Baverel-Robert. Now they are divorced.

References

French male biathletes
1974 births
Living people
Biathletes at the 1998 Winter Olympics
Biathletes at the 2002 Winter Olympics
Biathletes at the 2006 Winter Olympics
Olympic biathletes of France
Olympic bronze medalists for France
Olympic medalists in biathlon
Biathlon World Championships medalists
Medalists at the 2006 Winter Olympics
Medalists at the 2002 Winter Olympics
Sportspeople from Grenoble